Lee Hae-young (born 1973) is a South Korean film director and screenwriter. Lee wrote and directed his debut feature Like a Virgin (2006) (with director Lee Hae-jun), which won several awards for Best New Director and Best Screenplay. His first solo feature Foxy Festival (2010). His third feature is a mystery genre film The Silenced (2015).

Personal life 
Lee is openly gay.

Filmography

As director 
Like a Virgin (2006)
Foxy Festival (2010)
The Silenced (2015)
Believer (2018)
 Phantom (2023)
Believer 2 (TBA)

As screenwriter 
Coming Out (short film, 2000)
Conduct Zero (2002)
Au Revoir, UFO (2004)
Like a Virgin (2006)
Foxy Festival (2010)
26 Years (2012)
The Silenced (2015)
Believer (2018)

For original idea 
Kick the Moon (2001)

As script editor 
Arahan (2004)

Awards 
2006 7th Busan Film Critics Awards: Best New Director (Like a Virgin)
2006 27th Blue Dragon Film Awards: Best New Director (Like a Virgin)
2006 27th Blue Dragon Film Awards: Best Screenplay (Like a Virgin)
2006 5th Korean Film Awards: Best New Director (Like a Virgin)
2007 43rd Baeksang Arts Awards: Best Screenplay (Like a Virgin)

References

External links 
 
 
 

1973 births
Living people
South Korean film directors
South Korean screenwriters
LGBT film directors
Seoul Institute of the Arts alumni
South Korean LGBT screenwriters
Gay screenwriters